Wardlaw is a first name and surname of Scottish origin.

Wardlaw loosely translates to "watcher of the hill". The original Wardlaws resided in the Scottish highlands, hence "watch of the hill," where as Wardlows resided in the Scottish lowlands.

Family Motto:
"Famalias Firmat Pietas." ("Religion Strengthens Families.")

Persons

 Alan Wardlaw (1887–1938), Australian politician
 Barbara Wardlaw (contemporary), Canadian politician of the First Nations
 Chris Wardlaw (born 1950), Australian long-distance runner
 Claude Wardlaw (1901–1985), British botanist
 Elizabeth, Lady Wardlaw (1677–1727), Scottish noblewoman and poet
 Helen Wardlaw (born 1982), English cricketer
 Henry Wardlaw (died 1440), Scottish church leader, Bishop of St Andrews, founder of the University of St Andrews
 Iain Wardlaw (born 1985), Scottish cricketer
 Jack Wardlaw (1937–2012), American journalist
 Jesse Wardlaw (born 2000), Australian rules footballer
 Joanna Wardlaw (born 1958), Scottish physician, radiologist, and academic
 John Wardlaw-Milne (1879–1967), British politician for Kidderminster
 Kim McLane Wardlaw (born 1954), American jurist in the federal courts
 Lee Wardlaw (contemporary), American author of children's books
 Ralph Wardlaw (1779–1853), Scottish Presbyterian clergyman and writer
 Robert Wardlaw (1889–1964), Australian politician from Tasmania
 Walter Wardlaw (died c. 1387), Scottish Bishop of Glasgow, uncle of Henry Wardlaw

Peerage
Wardlaw baronets, a title in the Baronetage of Nova Scotia

Places

Wardlaw-Hartridge school in Edison, New Jersey
Ward Law, hill with a Roman fort, near Shearington, Dumfries & Galloway

Scottish surnames